Louis Lémery (25 January 1677 – 9 June 1743) was a French botanist and chemist.

The son of scientist Nicolas Lemery, Louis was appointed physician at the Hôtel-Dieu de Paris in 1710, and became demonstrator of chemistry at the Jardin du Roi in 1731. He was the author of a Traité des aliments (1702), and of a Dissertation sur la nature des os (1704), as well as of a number of papers on chemical topics. He also wrote "A Treatise of All Sorts of Foods, Both Animal and Vegetable; also of Drinkables: Giving an Account how to chuse the best Sort of all Kinds", first published in English in 1745.

References 

1677 births
1743 deaths
18th-century French botanists
18th-century French chemists
Members of the French Academy of Sciences
Scientists from Paris